"Hustlin' is the debut single by American rapper Rick Ross, and the first single from his debut album Port of Miami, produced by The Runners.

The song was a breakthrough for Ross, and skyrocketed him to worldwide fame almost overnight. It peaked at number54 on the US Billboard Hot 100, and led to Ross becoming the subject of a bidding war, receiving offers from Diddy's Bad Boy Entertainment and Irv Gotti's Murder Inc., before signing a multi million dollar deal with Def Jam Recordings.

The song is featured on the track list of the video game Skate. It is also featured in comedy films We're the Millers and Identity Thief, as well as “9Days”, a season3 episode of the scripted comedy series Brooklyn Nine-Nine. Comedian Katt Williams devised a comedy routine using the song's chorus to punctuate his humour; the routine is seen in the 2007 film American Hustle, and Williams later reprised the routine for one of his Split Sides Comedy Club performance segments in the 2008 video game Grand Theft Auto IV.

Music video
In the video, Rick Ross wears a shirt with the words "Boobie Boys" in homage to a drug gang. Pitbull, Trick Daddy, Cool and Dre, Smitty, DJ Drama, DJ Khaled, Field Mob, The Runners, and Trina are seen in the music video.

Remixes
The official remix of this song  features Jay-Z and Young Jeezy, which is also on the album. The song also appears remixed on DJ Drama & Lil Wayne's mixtape Dedication 2. An unofficial leaked remix was made featuring Lil Wayne, Z-Ro, Jay-Z, T.I., Busta Rhymes, Remy Ma, Young Jeezy and Lil Flip. Another unofficial remix was leaked featuring Jay-Z's verse.

Charts

Weekly charts

Year-end charts

Certifications

References

2006 debut singles
Rick Ross songs
Music videos directed by Gil Green
Songs written by Rick Ross
Songs written by Jermaine Jackson (hip hop producer)
Songs written by Andrew Harr
Songs about cocaine
2006 songs
Def Jam Recordings singles
Song recordings produced by the Runners
Trap music songs